Wang Haibin (born 27 December 1973 in Nanjing, Jiangsu) is Chairman of the China Fencing Association and Head Coach of the China National Fencing Team. In November 2021 in Lausanne, he was elected to a 3-year term on the executive committee of the International Fencing Federation (FIE). Earlier in his career, he was an internationally ranked Chinese foil fencer. He competed at the 1992 Summer Olympics, 1996 Summer Olympics, 2000 Summer Olympics and 2004 Summer Olympics.

He first competed at the Olympics in 1992, where he was eliminated in the second round of the Olympic foil tournament and finished tenth with the Chinese foil team in the team event.

In 1996, he was eliminated in the round of 16 of the Olympic foil tournament and finished ninth with the Chinese foil team in the team event.

Four years later in Sydney, he won the silver medal as part of the Chinese foil team. In the 2000 Olympic foil tournament he was eliminated in the round of 16 again.

In 2004 in Athens, he won the silver medal again as a member of the Chinese foil team. In the individual Olympic foil tournament he was eliminated in the first round again.

From 2005 to 2016, Wang served as the head men's foil coach for China's National Fencing Team, during which time he helped Lei Sheng win a gold medal at the 2012 London Olympics. From 2016 to 2021, Wang coached in the United States in New Haven, CT, where he helped lead a resurgence of the Yale University Men's and Women's Fencing Teams.

References 

1973 births
Living people
Chinese male fencers
Fencers at the 1992 Summer Olympics
Fencers at the 1996 Summer Olympics
Fencers at the 2000 Summer Olympics
Fencers at the 2004 Summer Olympics
Olympic fencers of China
Olympic silver medalists for China
Olympic medalists in fencing
Sportspeople from Nanjing
Asian Games medalists in fencing
Fencers at the 1994 Asian Games
Fencers at the 1998 Asian Games
Fencers at the 2002 Asian Games
Medalists at the 2000 Summer Olympics
Medalists at the 2004 Summer Olympics
Asian Games gold medalists for China
Asian Games silver medalists for China
Medalists at the 1994 Asian Games
Medalists at the 1998 Asian Games
Medalists at the 2002 Asian Games
Universiade medalists in fencing
Fencers from Jiangsu
Universiade bronze medalists for China
Medalists at the 1997 Summer Universiade
Medalists at the 1999 Summer Universiade
Medalists at the 2001 Summer Universiade